Alikram Hummatov or Ali Akram Hummatzade (also spelled as Alakram Hummatov, 28 October 1948 – 22 December 2022) was an Azerbaijani Talysh military commander and political activist. He was the president of the self-proclaimed Talysh-Mughan Autonomous Republic in 1993 and was imprisoned in Azerbaijan. He was considered as a political prisoner by international organizations including Amnesty International and the Council of Europe. After demands from the Council of Europe, Hummatov was granted retrials, yet according to Human Rights Watch report, the authorities conducted him inside prisons, and with procedural violations. He was pardoned in 2004 and stripped of his Azerbaijani citizenship; he lived in exile in the Netherlands.

Biography
Hummatov was born in 1948. He graduated from the Baku Polytechnical Institute, then worked in the automotive industry. In 1975, he joined the Communist Party of the Soviet Union. He served in different political parties, including the Popular Front of Azerbaijan. Following the dissolution of the Soviet Union in 1991, Hummatov was the leader of the self-declared Talysh-Mughan Autonomous Republic which existed briefly in the south of Azerbaijan at a time of political instability in 1993, and was "seen by many Azeris as a dangerous separatist."

Imprisonment
In 1995 Hummatov was sentenced to death by an Azerbaijani court, later commuted to life imprisonment, on a range of charges including treason. In an open letter to Azerbaijan President Ilham Aliyev, Sidiki Kaba, the president of the International Federation of Human Rights, wrote that Hummatov and Qaziyez "are being held in Qobustan prison. Their prison system is very strict and sentences them to isolation. In fact, under the pretext of protecting their physical integrity, these two prisoners have been locked up alone, in closed cells at night, which prevents them from receiving medical assistance throughout the night in the case a problem should arise." In prison Hummatov fell ill with tuberculosis and lost almost all of his teeth. He was among those identified in 2001 by the Council of Europe as political prisoners who should either be released or retried. In 2004 Hummatov was pardoned by President Aliyev, stripped of his Azerbaijani citizenship, and sent to the Netherlands where his family lived.

Hummatov vs. Azerbaijan case at the European Court
After emigrating to the Netherlands, Hummatov made two applications against the Republic of Azerbaijan to the European Court under Article 34 of the Convention for the Protection of Human Rights and Fundamental Freedoms. On 29 November 2007 the court sentenced the state of Azerbaijan to pay the applicant 12,000 EUR for non-pecuniary damages and 2,090 EUR for costs and expenses.

Later activities
Hummatov continued to campaign in exile for the rights of the Talysh people. In September 2013, he visited the self-proclaimed Republic of Artsakh, two decades after confronting Karabakh and Armenian forces on the battlefield. He met with university students in Stepanakert, where he criticized the current Azerbaijani government and called for a peaceful resolution of the Nagorno-Karabakh conflict, stating "I believe that we must do everything to establish peace in the region so that our beloved children live, create and study in peaceful conditions." Hummatov traveled to Karabakh from Armenia, where he inaugurated a graduate program of Talysh studies at the Yerevan State University on 24 September 2013.

Personal life 
Hummatov was married to Sudaba Rasulova; they had two sons. According to Rasulova, neither she nor her children know the Talysh language, and speak only Azerbaijani at home. Rasulova stated that she was unaware of Hummatov's plans to visit Armenia, and she does not understand why her husband traveled there. Hummatov died on 22 December 2022.

References

External links
Republic of Azerbaijan, report, Amnesty International, 2002
Written question E-0639/99, by Hanja Maij-Weggen (PPE) to the Commission, Official Journal of the European Communities, 1999
Azerbaijan in a stir over political prisoner, BBC, 2003

1948 births
2022 deaths
Azerbaijani people of Talysh descent
Article 3 of the European Convention on Human Rights
Article 6 of the European Convention on Human Rights
European Court of Human Rights cases involving Azerbaijan
Recipients of Azerbaijani presidential pardons
People convicted of treason
Azerbaijani prisoners sentenced to death
Prisoners sentenced to death by Azerbaijan
Azerbaijani prisoners sentenced to life imprisonment
Prisoners sentenced to life imprisonment by Azerbaijan
Communist Party of the Soviet Union members
Azerbaijani Social Democratic Party politicians
Azerbaijani people of the Nagorno-Karabakh War
Azerbaijani colonels
Azerbaijan Technical University alumni
Talysh people
The National Talysh Movement